Granby is an impact crater in Östergötland, Sweden, located to the southeast of Vadstena. It is estimated to have formed about 470 million years ago (Middle Ordovician).

References 

Impact craters of Sweden
Ordovician impact craters
Ordovician Sweden
Landforms of Östergötland County